Jaitpur Kalan is a block in Bah tehsil of Agra district in Uttar Pradesh, India.  Jaitpur kalan was founded by Maharaja Mahendra Jait Singh Bhadauria (1427-1464) of Bhadawar. Hindi is the main language spoken here while the main religion practiced is Hinduism. It also has a considerable Muslim and Jain population.  
Nagar Palika Parishad Bah looks after the sanitation, development and public recreation of the area.
Jaitpur kalan is also birthplace of Jitendra Tripathi 'Hemu' Chairman of 'Mother Vision India Group'.

External links
 Village Panchayats in Jaitpur Kalan
 School Scholarships available in Jaitpur Kalan
 Schools in Jaitpur Kalan
   Schools in Jaitpur Kalan

Cities and towns in Agra district